Laccognathus grossi is an extinct lobe-finned fish from eastern Europe. They existed during the Middle Devonian. The species is named after Walter Gross, who collected the first Laccognathus fossils belonging to L. panderi.

L. grossi was first recovered from the Middle Devonian Lode Formation of Latvia by Emiliya Ivanovna Vorobyeva, who described it as a specimen of the known species L. panderi. Upon closer examination in 2005, she redescribed the specimen (as well as the genus) under the new name L. grossi.

See also

 Sarcopterygii
 List of sarcopterygians
 List of prehistoric bony fish

References

Porolepiformes
Fossil taxa described in 2006
Fish described in 2006
Devonian bony fish